Jagdish Mehra (April 8, 1931 – September 14, 2008) was an Indian-American historian of science.

Academic career
Mehra was educated at Allahabad University, the Max Planck Institut für Physik and the University of California at Los Angeles and obtained a Ph.D. in theoretical physics at the University of Neuchatel.

He subsequently taught at Purdue University, Southeastern Massachusetts University, the University of Geneva, the Solvay Institute in Brussels, Rice University, the University of Houston and the International Center for Theoretical Physics.

He is particularly well known for a book in 6 volumes on The Historical Development of Quantum Theory, which he wrote with Helmut Rechenberg. He also wrote a biography of Richard Feynman.

He also wrote a book on the controversy surrounding the exact role David Hilbert played in the development of the gravitation theory of Albert Einstein.

Works
Mehra, J. (Ed.). The Physicist's Conception of Nature. Dordrecht, Netherlands: Reidel, 1973. 
Mehra, J. (Ed.). Proceedings of the Symposium on the Development of the Physicist's Conception of Nature in the Twentieth Century (Trieste, Italy; Sept. 18–25, 1972).
Mehra, J. Einstein, Hilbert and the Theory of Gravitation. Dordrecht, Netherlands: Reidel, 1974. 
Mehra, J. The Solvay Conferences on Physics. Aspects of the Development of Physics since 1911. Dordrecht, Netherlands: Reidel, 1975. 
Mehra, J. The Beat of a Different Drum: The Life and Science of Richard Feynman. Oxford, England: Clarendon Press, 1994. 
Mehra, J. Einstein, Physics and Reality. World Scientific, 1999. 
Mehra, J. The Quantum Principle: Its Interpretation and Epistemology. 
Mehra, J. The Golden Age of Theoretical Physics: Selected Essays. July 2000. 
Mehra, J. and Milton, K. A. Climbing the Mountain: The Scientific Biography of Julian Schwinger. 2000. 
Mehra, J. and Rechenberg, H. The Historical Development of Quantum Theory, Vol. 1: The Quantum Theory of Planck, Einstein, Bohr and Sommerfeld. Its Foundation and the Rise of Its Difficulties (1900-1925). New York: Springer-Verlag, 1982.
Mehra, J. and Rechenberg, H. The Historical Development of Quantum Theory, Vol. 2: The Discovery of Quantum Mechanics, 1925. New York: Springer-Verlag, 1982.
Mehra, J. and Rechenberg, H. The Historical Development of Quantum Theory, Vol. 3: The Formulation of Matrix Mechanics and Its Modifications 1925-1926. New York: Springer-Verlag, 1982.
Mehra, J. and Rechenberg, H. The Historical Development of Quantum Theory, Vol. 4: The Fundamental Equations of Quantum Mechanics 1925-1926. The Reception of the New Quantum Mechanics. New York: Springer-Verlag, 1982.
Mehra, J. and Rechenberg, H. The Historical Development of Quantum Theory, Vol. 5: Erwin Schrödinger and the Rise of Wave Mechanics. Part 1: Schrödinger in Vienna and Zurich 1887-1925. New York: Springer-Verlag, 1987.
Mehra, J. and Rechenberg, H. The Historical Development of Quantum Theory, Vol. 5: Erwin Schrödinger and the Rise of Wave Mechanics. Part 2: The creation of Wave Mechanics, Early Response and Applications 1925-1926. New York: Springer-Verlag, 1987.
Mehra, J. and Rechenberg, H. The Historical Development of Quantum Theory, Vol. 6: The Completion of Quantum Mechanics, 1926-1941, Part 1: The probabilistic Interpretation and the Empirical and Mathematical Foundation of Quantum Mechanics, 1926-1936. New York: Springer-Verlag, 2000.
Mehra, J. and Rechenberg, H. The Historical Development of Quantum Theory, Vol. 6: The Completion of Quantum Mechanics, 1926-1941, Part 2: The Conceptual Completion of Quantum Mechanics. New York: Springer-Verlag, 2001.
Mehra, J. and Wightman, A. S. (Eds.). The Collected Works of Eugene Paul Wigner (1902-1995), 8 vols. Berlin: Springer-Verlag, 1990-2000.

Reviews

References

Historians of science
University of Allahabad alumni
University of California, Los Angeles alumni
University of Neuchâtel alumni
Purdue University faculty
Academic staff of the University of Geneva
Rice University faculty
University of Houston faculty
1931 births
2008 deaths
Indian expatriates in Switzerland
Indian emigrants to the United States